Marina Leonidovna Kravets (Russian: Марина Леонидовна Кравец, born 18 May 1984, Leningrad, USSR) is a Russian actress  radio moderator and singer. She is the only permanent female participant of the Russian television show Comedy Club.

Early life 
Marina was born on 18 May 1984 in Saint Petersburg as the youngest child with two older brothers. She attended school a gymnasium number 524. Graduated from Saint Petersburg State University with a degree in philology.

Private life 
Kravets married Arkady Vodakhov on the 20 July 2013, who studied together with Kravets at the philological faculty and took part in KVN. In 2020 she gave birth to a daughter Veronika.

References

External links 
 

Russian actresses
21st-century Russian singers
Russian radio personalities
1984 births
Living people
21st-century Russian women singers